Imre Tiitsu (born June 18, 1980) is an Estonian ice sledge hockey player.

He was part of the Estonian sledge hockey team at the 2002 Winter Paralympics in Salt Lake City, United States.

He had an amputation of both legs after an accident.

References

External links
 

1980 births
Living people
Estonian sledge hockey players
Paralympic sledge hockey players of Estonia
Ice sledge hockey players at the 2002 Winter Paralympics
Amputee category Paralympic competitors
Sportspeople from Rakvere
21st-century Estonian people